Operation Sundarbans  or Operation Sundarban is a Bangladeshi wildlife action thriller movie. The film is co-written and directed by Dipankar Sengupta Dipon. The film is produced by RAB Welfare Cooperative Society Ltd. Nazim-ud-Doula and Dipon have written the screenplay. The plot is loosely based on real operations of RAB during surrender of robbers of Sundarbans as well as the struggle of Sundarbans' natives. It stars Riaz, Ziaul Roshan, Siam Ahmed, Taskeen Rahman, Shatabdi Wadud, Nusraat Faria and Darshana Banik, while Manoj Kumar Pramanik, debutant Samina Bashar, Dipu Imam, Ehsanur Rahman also joins the cast. The film begun its shooting on 20 December 2019 at Satkhira.

Plot 
The Sundarbans is the largest mangrove forest in the world, located in the southern part of Bangladesh. People of different trades in the region depend on this vast forest life. The pirates has persecuted these people for more than 40 years. People are not protected from the pirates of the Sundarbans which not only includes variety of species but also Royal Bengal Tiger.

In such a situation, the Rapid Action Battalion (RAB) Director General assigns the responsibility of the Sundarbans from the pirates to the RAB-7 commanding officer Ishtiaqe Ahmed. Ahmed launches an operation to make Sundarbans free of pirates with the help of commander of RAB Crime Prevention Unit (CPC)-1, Lieutenant Rishan (Ziaul Roshan) and the commander of newly formed Sundarbans Squad, Major Sayem (Siam Ahmed). Simultaneously, researcher Tania Kabir (Nusraat Faria) arrives in Sundarbans to do research on the tigers in the forest.

After the end of pirates episode, the team realizes that these bandits in the Sundarbans are just chess pieces. A disguised evil force is moving the wheels from behind. The team continues their fight against the mysterious forces at play.

Cast

Production

Development 
In April 2018, major producer of this film RAB welfare cooperative pitched the idea to Dipon for developing the script for a film based on RAB's operation for uprooting the robbers of Sunderbans. Therefore, Dipon randomly went to Sunderbans to study the scope of this film as well did researches on Mangrove forest. After research, Dipon himself along with Nazim-ud-Doula and research team RDT prepared the screenplay. On 14 June 2019 Bangladeshi daily Prothom Alo wrote that RAB Welfare coopertive was to finance 4 Crore (40 million) Taka for this film production. The film was officially announced on 13 June 2019 by the both production houses.

Casting 
Dipon kept the casting of these film in secret, later the cast was introduced on 1 November 2019 at an event held at Bagerhat Sheikh Helal Uddin Stadium for celebrating first year of robber-free Sunderban. Riaz, Nusraat, Roshan, Siam, Monoj Pramanik, Samina and Manoj Mitra made the  primary  cast list. Additionally Sheikh Ehsanur Rahman, Shatabdi Wadud, Manoj Mitro, and Tuya Chakraborthy have been cast in undisclosed roles. About hundred actors work in supporting roles including thirty members from RAB in non credited roles. Riaz, Nusraat, Roshan, Siam, Monoj Pramanik, Samina and Manoj Mitra made the primary  cast list. Later few other actors like Sheikh Ehsanur Rahman, Dipu Imam, Shatabdi and Darshana confirmed their casting. Riaz, Roshan and Siam received special training from RAB before cast their roles. Actors also underwent pre-shoot grooming and rehearsals before principal photography has begun.

Locations 
Mandar char, Bangabandhu char, Patnir char, Katkar char of greater Sunderbans forest was selected for primary shooting. Most of the outdoor shooting has taken places at Dublar Char, Alor Kol er Char, Kaalir Char, Meher Alir Char, Lakshmir Char and Hiron Point inside the deep forest of Sunderbans. Few indoor shoots taken from Bangladesh Film Development Corporation  and various RAB facilitates in Dhaka and Gazipur.

Filming 
Other the film songs, It took thirty six days to shoot the entire script. First phase of shooting has been started on 20 December 2019 at Buri Goalini, Chunkuri, Harinagar area near Sunderbans in Satkhira, was later for 16 days till 31 December 2019.
 Second phase of shooting starts from 13 February 2020, and stretched out up to 13 March 2020. Second phase shooting took places at the Bay of Bengal coast lines and Jamtala area and concluded on 11 March 2020.

Music

Marketing 
For marketing purposes, the film's production company used posters drawn by the country's classic film poster painter Bidesh Kumar Dhar.

Controversy 
On the day of the film's premiere, an assistant director, Tanin Khan, complained against the production team for not clearing his fee. He also accused the director of misbehaving with him. Responding to the complaint of Khan, director Dipon said that his dues were not explained for the non-completion of the project. The director also accused Khan of negligence in work and leaving without completing the second lot of the filming.

Release 
Its actual release date was 1 August 2020, but was postponed for COVID-19 epidemic. Later the date was changed to 21 July 2021 but wasn't released on that date. After the release of the official trailer on 29 July, the release date of the film was finalised to 23 September 2022. The film received clearance from the Bangladesh Film Censor Board on September 11. It was premiered in Star Cineplex, Bashundhara City on 20 September 2022. The film was scheduled to be released in 35 cinemas. The number of cinemas showing the film increased by 10 in the second week of its release. It was released in Sydney, Australia on 7 October 2022.

Critical Response 
The Daily Star called Operation Sundarbans an enjoyable film. MW Bangladesh Praised Operation Sundarbans by saying that it 'exceed the expections' giving The movie an  A Grade Rating.

References

External links 

 
 

2022 films
2020s Bengali-language films
Bengali-language Bangladeshi films
Sundarbans
Law enforcement in fiction
Bangladeshi action thriller films
Action films based on actual events
Films shot in Khulna
Bangladeshi films based on actual events
Films postponed due to the COVID-19 pandemic